Legends League Cricket or LLCT20  (also known as Skyexch.net Legends League Cricket for sponsorship reasons) is a T20 cricket league featuring players including recently retired international players. The first edition of Legends League Cricket was held at the Oman Cricket Academy Ground, Muscat in January 2022, featuring three teams - India Maharajas, Asia Lions and World Giants.  The second edition was held in India in September 2022, and featured private-franchise owned teams across six major cities. The second edition of league had been dedicated to the India's 75th Independence celebrations, dubbed as Azadi Ka Amrit Mahotsav celebrations.

The league is organized by Absolute Legends Sports Pvt. Ltd. Former Indian cricketer and India men's national cricket team coach Ravi Shastri is the Commissioner of the league.

Background 
Owned by Absolute Legends Sports Pvt Ltd, the Legends League Cricket is founded by Raman Raheja & Vivek Khushalani.  In November 2021, Ravi Shastri was appointed as the Commissioner of the League, immediately after his retirement as the Head Coach of the Indian National Cricket team. Pakistani cricketer Wasim Akram is associated with LLC as a member of the Apex Council along with Ravi Shastri. Former captain of the Indian Women's cricket team, Jhulan Goswami, is the Women's Empowerment Ambassador for the league and  Bollywood actor Amitabh Bachchan is the Brand ambassador. To ensure competitive cricket amongst the recently retired cricketers, Legends League Cricket appointed Andrew Leipus as the Director of Sports Science. His role is instrumental in working on the fitness and physical performance of the cricketers.

 Legends League Cricket (LLC) Masters 2023 schedule and squad

First edition 
For the first edition of the league, legendary cricketers Virender Sehwag (India Maharajas), Misbah ul Haq (Asia Lions), and Darren Sammy (World Giants) were chosen to be the captains of their respective teams. The league featured many cricketing legends like Brett Lee, Shoaib Akhtar, Muttiah Muralitharan, Kevin Pietersen, Irfan Pathan, Tillakaratne Dilshan, Mohammad Kaif, Sanath Jayasuriya, Mohammad Yousuf amongst others, playing against each other to reignite famous cricketing rivalries of the recent past. Shahid Afridi, Yuvraj Singh and Harbhajan Singh were also slated to play in the league but had to withdraw owing to the pandemic or other personal reasons.

The league launched a special initiative towards Women's empowerment in Cricket, with an all-women match officials team officiating over the entirety of first edition, which was a first of its kind initiative in men's cricket.

The league broadcast on the leading Sports Television Networks, like Sony Pictures Sports Network and Sony Liv acquiring the rights for the India territory. In Pakistan, TV rights were acquired by Geo Sports. In Sri Lanka, Supreme TV acquired the rights for the territory. Global Audio & Video streaming rights were acquired by Crictracker.

Venue 
First edition of the league was hosted under the aegis of Oman Cricket at Oman Cricket Academy Ground

Squads in first edition 

Although, initially named as captain of the India Maharajas, Virender Sehwag missed all matches of the first edition, after he was tested positive for COVID-19, just before the tournament started in Oman. Mohammed Kaif led the team in his absence. Daniel Vettori also missed out due to Covid-related travel restrictions. Yuvraj Singh also missed out on the first edition of LLC owing to the birth of his child with his wife. Harbhajan Singh also missed all the matches of the first edition after he tested positive for COVID-19.

The League clashed with the PSL, resulting in a lot cricketers from Pakistan returning after the 1st round of matches. Kamran Akmal, Mohammad Hafeez, Azhar Mahmood, Umar Gul played the first 2 matches for the Asia Lions, before returning to 2022 Pakistan Super League.
Imran Tahir was only available for the first two matches, before leaving the World Giants' squad for prior commitments in the 2022 Pakistan Super League.

Points table
Each team played the others only twice during the round-robin stage and Top two teams qualified for the final.

 Advanced to the final

Matches

1st match

2nd match

3rd match

4th match

5th match

6th match

Final

Statistics

 Player of the tournament =  Morne Morkel (World Giants)
 Most Runs =  Naman Ojha (India Maharajas) (259)
 Most Wickets =  Nuwan Kulasekara (8) (Asia Lions) and  Morne Morkel (World Giants) (8)

Second edition 

Background

After a successful first edition, LLC announced that a new format will be adopted and league will be held in India between 17 September and 5 October 2022. The new edition adopted a new franchise based format, which was different from the first edition's region-specific format. Four new teams were launched, each being owned and operated by private ownership. Many ex-international cricketers have confirmed their involvement.

In August, 2022, Ravi Shastri announced that the new league would honour the Azadi Ka Amrit Mahotsav celebrations marking the 75th anniversary of India's independence with a special commemorative match between India Maharajas and World Giants. The match will be played on 16 September 2022 at Eden Gardens in Kolkata, with BCCI President and ex-India captain, Sourav Ganguly, and World-Cup winning ex-England captain, Eoin Morgan, leading the respective sides.

The league has announced that this edition will have 15 matches, with the special commemorative match making it a total of 16. It was announced that this edition will be played in 6 different cities. The 6 cities named as venues for the matches are - Kolkata, Lucknow, Delhi, Cuttack, Jodhpur and Rajkot.

The league was broadcast on Star Sports Network acquiring the rights for the India territory.

In September 2022, it was announced that India Maharajas and World Giants will be led by one of India's most successful opening batters, Virender Sehwag and legendary South African allrounder, Jacques Kallis respectively.

Azadi Ka Amrit Mahotsav celebration special match

Squads
The squads for India Maharajas and World Giants for the match to be played on 16 September 2022 are as follows:

 On 3 September 2022, Ganguly withdrew from the league citing personal reasons.

Result

Venues 

The matches were played at Eden Gardens in Kolkata, Arun Jaitley Stadium in New Delhi, BRSABV Ekana Cricket Stadium in Lucknow, Barkatullah Khan Stadium in Jodhpur, Sawai Mansingh Stadium in Jaipur and Barabati Stadium in Cuttack. The Qualifiers were played in Jodhpur and the venue for the final was Jaipur.

Teams 
The following teams and their owners were announced as taking part in the tournament:

Squads 
Squads for the main tournament were selected through a draft which took place on 2 September 2022.

The draft rules were as follows:
 77 Players to be picked from 5 categories : Batters, Fast Bowlers, Spinners, All-rounders and Wicket Keepers
 Maximum 20 rounds of calling with one call from each team
 Each team will have 120 seconds to make a call in every round
 18 to 25 players with a minimum of 6 Indian players to form a team
 Lucky draw decides the order of call after every round

On 4 September 2022, Chris Gayle joined the Gujarat Giants. 
 On 5 September 2022, Corey Anderson, Daren Sammy and Imran Tahir were added by the Manipal Tigers.
 On 9 September 2022, Solomon Mire and Ashley Nurse were added by the India Capitals.
 On 9 September 2022, Due to unforeseen reasons, Mashrafe Mortaza missed out on playing for India Capitals and World Giants.

Points table 
A total of 12 league matches will be played in a double round robin format with each team playing against  every other team twice. Of the four teams, top three teams will qualify for the playoffs.

  Qualified for the playoffs

Tie-break criteria 

 Number of wins.
 Head-to-head results. If this is not applicable, positions are decided by net run rate (NRR).
 If three or more teams are tied on points and the number of wins, positions are decided by net run rate.

Matches

League stage 
On 23 August 2022, a tentative schedule for the league stage was announced on the Legends League Cricket Twitter page. On 7 September 2022, the full schedule was announced.

Round 1

Round 2

Play-offs

Bracket

Final

Third edition

For the third edition of the league, legendary cricketers Shahid Afridi (Asia Lions), Aaron Finch (World Giants), and Gautam Gambhir (India Maharajas), were chosen to be the captains of their respective teams. The league featured many cricketing legends like Shahid Afridi, Brett Lee, Shoaib Akhtar, Aaron Finch, Irfan Pathan, Tillakaratne Dilshan, Chris Gayle, S. Sreesanth amongst others, playing against each other to reignite famous cricketing rivalries of the recent past.

The league's television rights were acquired by Star Sports while digital streaming rights were acquired by Disney+ Hotstar and Fancode.

In the final, Asia Lions beat World Giants by 7 wickets to win their first title.

Viewership 
As per reports, the 1st season of Legends League Cricket had a global reach of 703 million cricket fans from around the world. As per reports, it became the most watched International T20 League outside of Pakistan Super League, Indian Premier League, with more viewership than Big Bash, Caribbean Premier League in India.

Broadcasters 

 Star Sports, Disney+ Hotstar and FanCode are the official broadcasters of this league in India.

References

External links 

 Series home at ESPN Cricinfo
 Series home at Cricbuzz
 

Sports leagues established in 2021
Twenty20 cricket leagues
International cricket competitions in Oman
2021 in Omani cricket
2022 in Omani cricket